Bellemont may refer to:
Bellemont, Arizona
Bellemont, North Carolina
Bellemont, Oklahoma
Bellemont, Pennsylvania

See also
Bellemonte